Salem Abdullah Al-Jabri (Arabic:سالم عبد الله الجابري) (born 17 September 1998) is an Emirati footballer. He currently plays as a left back for Al Ain.

External links

References

1998 births
Emirati footballers
Living people
Al Ain FC players
UAE Pro League players
Association football fullbacks
Place of birth missing (living people)